Niklas Wikegård (born October 3, 1963) is a Swedish former ice hockey player and coach, currently working for the TV4 Group as a color commentator in ice hockey-related shows.

Wikegård was head coach for Djurgårdens IF between 2002 and 2005. He has also coached Väsby IK, Bodens IK, and Swiss team EHC Chur. He also worked as an assistant coach to Stephan Lundh in Djurgården 1996 to 1998, and in Malmö Redhawks 1998 to 2001.

In several years Wikegård worked as a color commentator for SVT during hockey games and as a co-host of the show Hockeykväll. On May 23, 2011, SVT announced that Wikegård would leave SVT. The day later Wikegård signed a three-year-long contract with the TV4 Group. Wikegård is also working for the online gambling company Expekt.com.

References

External links

1963 births
Living people
People from Gävle
Swedish ice hockey coaches
Washington Capitals scouts
Sportspeople from Gävleborg County
Djurgårdens IF Hockey coaches